This is a list of all the Grand Slam women's singles finals in tennis. From the 1884 Wimbledon Championships up to and including the 2022 Australian Open, there have been 449 finals contested between 221 different women, with 126 champions emerging.

Chronological list

Records and statistics

Longest and shortest finals

Longest by number of games

Shortest by number of games

First-timer finals 
There have been 26 finals contested between first-time finalists (11 in the Open Era):

All-countrywomen finals (Open Era) 
Five countries (Australia, Belgium, Italy, Russia and the United States) have had two countrywomen meet in a final in the Open Era:

Notes

See also
 List of Grand Slam women's singles champions
 List of Grand Slam men's singles finals

References

final